Events from the year 1790 in art.

Events
 April–May – Josiah Wedgwood shows off his first reproductions of the Portland Vase, in jasperware.

Works

 William Blake – The Marriage of Heaven and Hell
 Giuseppe Cades – The Virgin Mary and Infant Jesus served by the Angels
 Henri-Pierre Danloux – Le supplice d'une vestale
 Johann Heinrich Fussli – Thor Battering the Midgard Serpent
 Gaetano Gandolfi – Joseph's Dream
 Francisco de Goya – El Afilador and Sagrada Familia
 Angelica Kauffman – Venus überredet Helena Paris zu erhören
 Thomas Lawrence – Portrait of Queen Charlotte
 Giovanni Domenico Tiepolo – Pulcinella und Saltimbanchi
 John Trumbull – Washington at Verplanck's Point
 (approximate date)
 Joseph Wright of Derby – Richard Arkwright

Births
 January 1 – George Petrie, Irish painter, musician, antiquary and archaeologist (died 1866)
 January 25 – Moritz Michael Daffinger, Austrian miniature painter and sculptor (died 1849)
 January 30 – Carl Gustaf Löwenhielm, Swedish diplomat who made paintings of the countries in which he served (died 1858)
 February 19 – Anton Schimser, Polish sculptor of Austrian origin (died 1838)
 March – Kapiton Zelentsov, Russian painter notable for his book illustrations (died 1845)
 March 14 – Ludwig Emil Grimm, German painter and engraver (died 1863)
 March 28 – William Henry Hunt, English water-color painter (died 1864)
 May 22 - Bianca Milesi, Italian writer, painter, and patriot (died 1849)
 May 23 - James Pradier, Swiss-born French sculptor in the neoclassical style (died 1852)
 June 19 – John Gibson, Welsh-born sculptor (died 1866)
 July 6 – Giuseppe Tominz, Italian-Slovenian portrait painter (died 1866)
 July 18 – John Frazee, first American born sculptor to execute a bust in marble (died 1852)
 September 24 – Robert Trewick Bone, English painter of sacred, classical and genre scenes (died 1840)
 date unknown
 Willis Buell, American politician and portrait painter (died 1851)
 Keisai Eisen, Japanese ukiyo-e artist (died 1848)
 Henri van der Haert, Belgian portrait painter, sculptor, illustrator and engraver (died 1846)
 Paweł Maliński, Czech-born sculptor and mason who lived and worked in Poland (died 1853)
 Edward Villiers Rippingille, English painter (died 1859)
 Luigi Rossini, Italian artist known for his etchings of ancient Roman architecture (died 1857)

Deaths
 February 20 – Erik Pauelsen, Danish landscape painter (born 1749)
 March 8 – Augustyn Mirys, Polish painter (born 1700)
 March 28 – François-Elie Vincent, Swiss painter of portrait miniatures  (born 1708)
 April 29 – Charles-Nicolas Cochin, French engraver, designer, writer, and art critic (born 1715)
 August – Agostino Carlini, Italian sculptor and painter (born 1718)
 September 24 – John Keyse Sherwin, English engraver and painter (born 1751)
 date unknown:
 Isoda Koryusai, Japanese printmaker and painter (born 1735)
 Niccolò Lapiccola, Italian painter (born 1730)

 
Years of the 18th century in art
1790s in art